Ma's Roadhouse is an American reality television series airing on the truTV network. The series provides an inside look at the Strokers Dallas biker bar located in Texas. Rick Fairless is the owner of Strokers Dallas, a Texas motorcycle shop, tattoo parlor and biker bar. His greatest asset is his 71-year-old mother, who's also his best, but most outspoken, employee.

Production and broadcast history
Ma's Roadhouse premiered on truTV on September 15, 2010.  The show had 7 episodes during its first season.  The last episode of the first season was aired on October 27, 2010.

Cast
Rick Fairless, Owner
Sharon "Ma" Fairless (Manager/Cook)
Lena (Parts Department)
Sue (Office Manager)
Meghan (Marketing & PR Manager)
Debbie ("Resident Babe")
Nick Jones ("Staff Calendar Photographer")

References

External links
 Ma's Roadhouse

2000s American reality television series
TruTV original programming
Television shows set in Dallas